The Persian Contributions to the English Language: An Historical Dictionary is a 2001 book by Garland Cannon and Alan S. Kaye. It is a historical dictionary of Persian loanwords in English which includes 811 Persian words appeared in English texts since 1225 CE.

Reception
The book was reviewed by  Karlheinz Mörth, Golnaz Modarresi Ghavami, John R. Perry and Mousa A. Btoosh.

References

External links 
The Persian Contributions to the English Language: An Historical Dictionary

2001 non-fiction books
Harrassowitz Verlag books
Historical dictionaries
English bilingual dictionaries
Persian dictionaries